Tata Interactive Systems (TIS) was an Indian developer of custom e-learning based in Kolkata, India. The company was acquired by MPS Limited (a global publishing and content and platform developer) in June 2018. The company was represented across the United States, Canada, Australia, New Zealand, Brazil, the Middle East, India, the United Kingdom, The Netherlands and Switzerland. TIS' offered corporations, universities, schools, publishers and government institutions training including simulations, story based learning, courseware and curriculum design & development, special-needs education, assessment tools, electronic performance support systems (EPSS), mobile learning, game-based learning, consulting services and training outsourcing services. Until the acquisition, TIS was a part of the $100bn Tata Group. The newly acquired company is now known as MPS Interactive Systems.

TIS was the only e-learning organization in the world to be assessed at Level 5 in both the SEI-CMM (Carnegie Mellon University Software Engineering Institute’s Capability Maturity Model) and P-CMM (People-Capability Maturity Model) frameworks.

Key Milestones 

1990 – TIS founded
1991 – Developed India’s first Computer-based Training (CBT) product and got its first export order
1994 – First US and Europe orders
1995 – First simulation-based CBT on Waste Water Treatment Plant
1996 – TIS entered UK market; proposes and designs Website for the Tata Group
2002 – Entered the Middle East and Australia markets
2004 – Opened a new Development Center in Kolkata, India
2006 – Acquired TOPSIM, a simulations company in Germany and Tertia Edusoft AG a Swiss e-learning company
2007 – Expanded operations in Germany and Northern Europe by setting up offices in Köln and Amsterdam
2011 - Launched CLASS EDGE, a comprehensive learning solution for Indian Schools
2018 - Sold to MPS Limited.

Achievements 

Tata Interactive Systems created about 3000 hours of e-learning content annually for more than 50 Fortune 500 clients. TIS had an 800+ strong team working on 220+ concurrent projects.

References 

Companies based in Kolkata
Indian companies established in 1990
Tata Group
Software companies established in 1990
Software companies of India
1990 establishments in West Bengal